Violetta Schurawlow (born 1 March 1986) is a German actress. She appeared in more than ten films since 2012.

Selected filmography

References

External links 

1986 births
Living people
German film actresses